Jiří Polanský (born December 18, 1981) is a Czech professional ice hockey player. He played with HC Oceláři Třinec in the Czech Extraliga during the 2010–11 Czech Extraliga season.

References

External links 
 
 

1981 births
Czech ice hockey forwards
HC Oceláři Třinec players
Living people
Ice hockey people from Brno
HC Kometa Brno players
EHC Olten players
HC Havířov players
MsHK Žilina players
Czech expatriate ice hockey players in Slovakia
Czech expatriate ice hockey players in Switzerland